Barzy-en-Thiérache (literally Barzy in Thiérache) is a commune in the department of Aisne in the Hauts-de-France region of northern France.

Geography
Barzy-en-Thiérache is located some 40 km south by southeast of Cambrai and 40 km northeast of Saint-Quentin. The Route Nationale D1043 from Bergues-sur-Sambre to Le Nouvion-en-Thiérache passes through the southern tip of the commune but does not provide direct access. Access to the village and the commune is by road D261 running north-east from the D1043 continuing north-east as the D262. The D664 also runs north from the village to Le Rejet-du-Moulin. The eastern border of the commune is also the border between Aisne and Nord departments. There are four hamlets in the commune other than the village: La Justice, Etreux, Mon Idee, and La Haie Long Pre. The rest of the commune is entirely farmland.

The Sambre river runs from east to west through the commune and the village fed by the Ruisseau du Vivier Bare. The Sambre river continues west to join the Sambre–Oise Canal.

Neighbouring communes and villages

History
In 1153 the name of the village was Villa que dicitur Baisis. It then became Barisis in 1227. The first name was given as Baisse for the neighborhood. The second name was Barri then became Barrié then Barrière. This tends to demonstrate the frontier character of the village with the Sambre running through it. The part of the village north of the Sambre was under the stewardship of the Landrecy family (County of Hainaut). The southern part of the village was under the stewardship of Laon and the lordship of Lesquielles (Thiérache-Picardy).

In 1956 the name of the commune was Barzy which then changed to Barzy-en-Thiérache.

On 7 Thermidor Year 2 (August 1794) the enemy invaded the village  and there was one civilian casualty - Joseph Licking.

Towards the end of the First World War, on 5 November 1918, the advance of French and British troops was stopped in a bloodbath 500 metres from the village (25 soldiers and 2 civilians were killed). On 6 November, after a violent French bombardment, the 73rd Infantry Regiment and the 59th Algerian Riflemen liberated the commune at 5.30am and released nearly a thousand inhabitants and refugees. For these events, the village was decorated with the Croix de Guerre 1914-1918.

Heraldry

Administration

List of Successive Mayors of Barzy-en-Thiérache

Population

Culture and heritage

Civil heritage
The commune has a number of buildings and structures that are registered as historical monuments:

A Farmhouse at Grand Rue 13 (1908)
A House at Grand Rue 14 (19th century)
A Farmhouse at Grand Rue 15 (1760)
A Farmhouse at Grand Rue 26 (18th century)
The Town Hall / School at Grand Rue 43 (1863)
A Farmhouse at Grand Rue 6 (1880)
The War memorial at Rue Neuve (1921) was the work of  Coulon, a marble sculptor from Le Nouvion-en-Thiérache in 1920-1921. The monument mentions, in addition to the victims from the village, the participation of the Algerian Riflemen who died to liberate the commune. There is a second memorial in the cemetery with a difference of three names which could not be agreed.
A Farmhouse at 4 CD 26 de Pinon (19th century)
A Farmhouse at 3 Rue de Sart (19th century)
Houses and Farms (17th-20th centuries)

Religious heritage
The commune has several religious buildings and structures that are registered as historical monuments:
A Presbytery (1788)
An Oratory at Grand Rue (1724)
The Parish Church of the Assumption (1705). It was rebuilt in 1705 with an older choir. There is a grotto of Lourdes dating from the 20th century. The Church contains several items that are registered as historical objects:
The Furniture in the Church
A Ciborium (1819)
A Painting: The Assumption (19th century)
A Statue: Virgin and child (1724)
6 Stained glass windows (Bays 5 to 10) (1922)
4 Stained glass windows (Bays 1 to 4) (1872)

See also
Communes of the Aisne department

References

External links
Barzy-en-Thiérache on Géoportail, National Geographic Institute (IGN) website 
Barzy on the 1750 Cassini Map

Communes of Aisne